A motion to strike may refer to:

 Motion to strike (court of law), a legal motion given by one party in a trial requesting the presiding judge order the removal of all or part of the opposing party's pleading to the court
 Motion to strike (United States Congress), an amendment that seeks to delete language from a bill proposed in either the House of Representatives or Senate of the United States Congress, or to delete language from an earlier amendment